Nawab ud Din Ramdasi (1870–1946) was an Indian Sufi scholar and preacher of Islam.

Nawab ud Din Randasi's parents were Muhammad Musa and Bakhtawar Begum.

There are still living descendants of Nawab ud Din Ramdasi alive today.

References

External sources
 Zikr e Paka by Tufail Nasri
 Tazkara Sufi Nawab ud Din
 Aftab e Shawalak I, published by Kutab Khana Maqbool e Aam Attock
 Aftab e Shawalak II, published by Kutab Khana Maqbool e Aam Attock
 Aftab e Shawalak III, published by Kutab Khana Maqbool e Aam Attock

1870 births
1946 deaths
20th-century Indian Muslims
Scholars of Sufism